Juha is a masculine given name.

Juha may also refer to:

 Juha (novel), a 1911 novel by Juhani Aho
 Juha (Merikanto), a 1922 opera based on the novel by Aarre Merikanto
 Juha (Madetoja), a 1935 opera based on the novel by Leevi Madetoja
 Juha (1937 film), a Finnish film adaptation directed by Nyrki Tapiovaara
 Juha (1999 film), a Finnish film adaptation directed by Aki Kaurismäki
 Juha, Saudi Arabia, village in Jizan Province
 Olga Juha (born 1962), Hungarian retired high jumper
 Juha, a figure from Arabic folklore dating to the 9th century, now fused with the 13th-century Turkish wit and folklore character Nasreddin

See also 
 Juhan
 Juhana
 Juhani